"The Elder" and "the Younger" are epithets generally used to distinguish between two individuals, often close relatives. In some cases, one of the pair is not known as "the Elder" or "the Younger", e.g. Carl Linnaeus; in such cases, they are not listed in a separate column.

People

Ancient world

Middle Ages
Note: Several pairs straddle the line between the Middle Ages and the modern era. When both were born prior to 1500, they are included here.

Modern era

Biblical and mythical figures

Fictional characters

See also
 List of people known as the Young

Elder